Tropidurus lagunablanca is a species of lizard of the Tropiduridae family. It is found in Paraguay and Brazil.

References

Tropidurus
Reptiles described in 2016
Reptiles of Paraguay
Reptiles of Brazil